Robin Fior (27 January 1935 – 29 September 2012) was a designer closely associated with radical and libertarian causes in the 1960s and 70s.

Born in London, Fior learned typesetting as a public schoolboy at Harrow. As a designer and typographer, he was self-taught, learning on the job and from colleagues and printers. His single year as an undergraduate in the English department at Oxford was spent mostly in bookshops. But he developed an interest in language and politics that marked his entire professional and social life.

References

External links
Eyemagazine.com

1935 births
2012 deaths
English graphic designers
English illustrators
Artists from London
People educated at Harrow School
English typographers and type designers
Alumni of the University of Oxford